Valérie Mangin (born 14 August 1973 in Nancy) is a French comic book writer.

References

External links 
 mangin.tv, website

1973 births
Living people
Writers from Nancy, France
French comics writers
École Nationale des Chartes alumni